Alan Sorrenti (born 9 December 1950) is an Italian singer and composer.

Biography 
Sorrenti was born in Naples, but his mother was Welsh, and he spent much of his childhood in Aberystwyth, Wales.  As a result, he is fluent in both Italian and English and has sung in both languages throughout his career.  Sorrenti's career began in the early 1970s; he released his first album, Aria, in 1972, followed by Come un vecchio incensiere all'alba di un villaggio deserto in 1973, both consisting mostly of progressive rock and experimental tracks.

In 1976, Alan Sorrenti shifted genre and released tracks more reminiscent of the dance genre. In late 1979 he scored a major European hit with the single "Tu sei l'unica donna per me", since then covered in a number of different languages.

Alan represented Italy in the 1980 Eurovision Song Contest with the song "Non so che darei". He finished sixth in the contest but the track became one of that year's bestselling entries in Continental Europe and Scandinavia after the winner Johnny Logan's "What's Another Year".

In 2006, Sorrenti participated in the festival O' Scià on the Lampedusa island.

Alan's younger sister Jenny Sorrenti is also a recording artist and has released two albums with her progressive folk/rock band Saint Just, as well as several solo albums.

Discography 
 Aria (1972)
 Come un vecchio incensiere all'alba di un villaggio deserto (1973)
 Alan Sorrenti (1974)
 Sienteme, it's time to land (1976)
 Figli delle Stelle (1977)
 L.A. & N.Y. (1979)
 Di notte (1980)
 Alan Sorrenti (1981) (Japan)
 Angeli di strada (1983)
 Bonno Soku Bodai (1987)
 Radici (1992)
 Kyoko mon amour (1997)
 Miami (1996)
 Sottacqua (2003)
 The Prog Years, 5 Cd-BoxSet (2018)

References 

 Artist ALAN SORRENTI

External links 
 

 

1950 births
Eurovision Song Contest entrants of 1980
Italian rock singers
Italian composers
Italian male composers
Eurovision Song Contest entrants for Italy
Living people
Musicians from Naples
Harvest Records artists
Italian emigrants to the United Kingdom